Jan Lindholm (born 1951) is a Swedish Green Party politician, member of the Riksdag since 2004.

References

1951 births
Living people
Members of the Riksdag 2002–2006
Members of the Riksdag 2006–2010
Members of the Riksdag 2010–2014
Members of the Riksdag 2014–2018
Members of the Riksdag from the Green Party